Goldkamp is a surname. Notable people with the surname include:

John Goldkamp (1947–2012), American criminologist
Marion Hellmann (née Goldkamp; born 1967), former German high jumper